Susangerd ( also Romanized as Sūsangird or Sūsangurd), also known as al-Khafājiyah, Dasht-e Āzādegān or Dasht-i-Mishān, is a city in the Central District of Dasht-e Azadegan County, Khuzestan Province, Iran. At the 2006 census, its population was 43,591, in 7,636 families.

The population of Susangerd is more than 120.000 people, and the vast majority of its inhabitants are Khuzestani Arab people. Susangerd is considered among the famous cities of Iran due to Iran-Iraq war and also because of liberation of Susangerd (from the siege of Iraqi forces).

On July 21, 2021, protests triggered by the severe shortage of water in the region occurred in Susangerd alongside multiple other cities, among them Masjed Soleyman, Izeh, Shushtar and Ahvaz.

See also
 Hoveyzeh
 Shadegan
 Bostan
 Liberation of Susangerd

References

Populated places in Dasht-e Azadegan County
Cities in Khuzestan Province
Arab settlements in Khuzestan Province